Julius Lange may refer to:

 Julius Lange (painter) (1817–1878), German landscape painter
 Julius Lange (art historian) (1838–1896), Danish art historian
 Julius Lange (numismatist) (1815–1905), German numismatist

See also 
 Lange (surname)